The western violet-backed sunbird or Longuemare's sunbird (Anthreptes longuemarei) is a species of bird in the family Nectariniidae. It is the most widely ranging species in the violet-backed sunbird superspecies, ranging throughout a large part of tropical mainland sub-Saharan Africa not inhabited by other members of the superspecies. It is mainly found in regions with mesic woodland.

References

External links
 (Western) violet-backed sunbird - Species text in The Atlas of Southern African Birds.

western violet-backed sunbird
Birds of Sub-Saharan Africa
western violet-backed sunbird
Taxonomy articles created by Polbot